is a History Professor at Hiroshima University.
He has written extensively about forced prostitution under the Japanese Empire, as well as in Japan under US military rule. He also writes about the laws of warfare.

Works
 Hidden Horrors: Japanese War Crimes in World War II, Westview Press (1996) 
 Japan's Comfort Women: Sexual Slavery and Prostitution During World War II and the US Occupation, Routledge (2001)  
 (co-edited with Marilyn B. Young) Bombing Civilians: A Twentieth Century History, The New Press (2009)

External links
 "Introducing Yuki TANAKA" Personal information in Japan Focus website
 "The Hibakusha Voice and the Future of the Anti-Nuclear Movement", lecture delivered on January 25, 2005
 "Japan admits war crimes conducted in WWII" Transcript of an interview with Prof. Tanaka on Australian Broadcasting Corporation, broadcast August 28, 2002
 
 A Proposal from Hiroshima, article by Yuki Tanaka in Digital Development Debates, July 2015.
 US Congressional Research Service's Report about Comfort Woman

1949 births
20th-century Japanese historians
Living people
Academic staff of Hiroshima University
Rikkyo University alumni
21st-century Japanese historians